The 1984 Florida Gators football team represented the University of Florida during the 1984 NCAA Division I-A football season. The campaign was Charley Pell's sixth and last as the head coach of the Florida Gators football team, as he was forced to resign three games into the season after the release of an NCAA report detailing numerous recruiting and other rules violations committed during his tenure at Florida. Offensive coordinator Galen Hall had been hired the previous summer and was not implicated in the scandal, so he was named interim head coach.

After starting the season 1–1–1 under Pell, the Gators went 8–0 under Hall to post a 9–1–1 overall record, including 5–0–1 in the Southeastern Conference (SEC), and Hall was named the SEC Coach of the Year. Florida was ranked #3 in the final Associated Press poll - the highest finish in program history up to that time - and were declared national champions by several minor pollsters, including the New York Times and The Sporting News. However, due to NCAA sanctions, the Gators were not permitted to participate in a bowl game.

Florida led the SEC in both points scored (31 points per game) and points allowed (15.5 points per game). The balanced offense featured freshman quarterback and SEC Player of the Year  Kerwin Bell, three running backs who would be NFL first round draft picks in John L. Williams, Neal Anderson, and Lorenzo Hampton, and another future first round pick in freshman wide receiver Ricky Nattiel. The offensive line was dubbed "The Great Wall of Florida" and featured several all-conference lineman, including yet another future first round pick in tackle Lomas Brown, helping Florida lead the conference in rushing with 240 yards per game. The defense featured two consensus all-conference players in noseguard Tim Newton and linebacker Alonzo Johnson.

No Florida football squad had ever been undefeated in the SEC or had won a conference championship, so there was much rejoicing in Gainesville when the 1984 team clinched the best record in the league in November. However, due to the NCAA violations committed under Pell, the title was retroactively vacated in May 1985 by a vote of the presidents of the SEC schools. Florida would again top the conference standings in 1985 but had been declared ineligible for the SEC championship before the season began. The program did not win an officially recognized SEC football championship until 1991.

Schedule

Personnel

Game summaries

vs. Miami (FL)

    
    
    
    
    
    
    
    
    
    
    

The Florida Gators opened the 1984 season with a neutral site clash at Tampa Stadium against their in-state rival and defending national champion Miami Hurricanes. The game was nationally televised by ESPN as the second game of a double-header on the network's first day broadcasting live college football.

Redshirt freshman Kerwin Bell unexpectedly became Florida's starting quarterback four days before the game when senior Dale Dorminey suffered a serious knee injury in practice. Supported by an effective rushing attack, Bell played well in his first collegiate appearance, and the game was close throughout. With his team down by six points late in the fourth quarter, Bell led the Gators on a long drive that culminated with a touchdown pass that gave them a 20-19 lead with under a minute remaining. However, Miami senior quarterback Bernie Kosar quickly led the Hurricanes down the field and threw a responding touchdown pass with six seconds left, putting Miami back ahead 26-20. The Gators lined up for one last play deep in their own territory with one second left. Bell threw a Hail Mary pass that was intercepted by Miami defensive back Tolbert Bain and returned for touchdown as time expired, giving Miami a 32–20 victory and covering the point spread, as the Hurricanes had been a 6.5 point favorite.

at Tennessee

John L. Williams led the team in receiving and added 100 yards on the ground.
The game featured 1,060 total yards and 47 first downs.

vs. Georgia

After suffering several defeats to the Bulldogs with a conference championship at stake, the Gators entered the rivalry game in Jacksonville undefeated in the SEC.  The Gators dominated early, building a 17–0 lead by early in the second half. Georgia seemed to come alive in the third quarter, mounting a long time-consuming drive into Florida territory. However, they were stopped near Florida's goal line on a fourth down play, giving the Gators the ball inside their own one yard line. On the third play following the change of possession, Gator quarterback Kerwin Bell dropped back into his own end zone and lofted a long pass down the sideline to wide receiver Ricky Nattiel, who went 96 yards for a touchdown.  Florida regained the momentum and went on to win 27–0, their largest margin of victory in the series at the time.

Kentucky

Postseason
Despite winning the SEC title, the Gators were barred from going to the 1985 Sugar Bowl due to the violations committed under Pell; runner-up LSU went in their place.
On May 30, 1985, the presidents of the ten SEC-member universities voted 6–4 to vacate the Gators' 1984 SEC title and declared the team ineligible for the SEC championship during the upcoming 1985 and 1986 seasons because of the rule violations committed under Pell.  The retroactive vacating of the 1984 championship, six months after the 1984 football season ended, drew an angry response from University of Florida president Marshall Criser, as well as Gators coaches, players and fans due to the retroactive nature of the decision and its perceived unfairness.

References

Florida
Florida Gators football seasons
Southeastern Conference football champion seasons
Florida Gators football